Jordan River is a stream or very small river on Beaver Island of approximately  in length.  Flowing northeastward into Lake Michigan, it drains an area of wetlands in central Beaver Island.  Much of the river is located within the Beaver Islands State Wildlife Research Area.

References

Rivers of Charlevoix County, Michigan
Rivers of Michigan
Tributaries of Lake Michigan